Luis Enrique Víquez Galagarza (born 15 August 1963) is a retired Costa Rican footballer.

Club career
Born in Puntarenas, Galagarza made his professional debut for local side Puntarenas in the Primera Division de Costa Rica on 25 October 1981 against Limonense and won the league title during the 1986–1987 season.

The burly midfielder also played for San Carlos and Guanacasteca. He retired after a game on 28 September 1997 against Carmelita.

International career
He made his debut for Costa Rica in an August 1984 Summer Olympics match against Italy and earned a total of 4 caps. He was part of the squad that played at the 1984 Olympic Games held in Los Angeles.

Personal life
Galagarza is a son of Carlos Luis Víquez Jiménez and Elizabeth Galagarza Calderón. He is divorced and has 3 children.

References

External links
 Un guerrero de luces y sombras•Luis Galagarza deja atrás 15 años de futbol, convencido de que puede dar más (Biography) - Nación 

1963 births
Living people
People from Puntarenas
Association football midfielders
Costa Rican footballers
Costa Rica international footballers
Olympic footballers of Costa Rica
Footballers at the 1984 Summer Olympics
Puntarenas F.C. players
A.D. San Carlos footballers